The Grand Canal in Venice is a c. 1736-1740 oil on canvas veduta by Bernardo Bellotto. It is now in the Musée des Beaux-Arts de Lyon, which bought it in 1891.

Description
Maneuvering gondolas are seen in the foreground, with buildings on either side of the Grand Canal at Campo San Samuele (some missing today on the right replaced by the Grassi Palace, and one under construction on the left the Ca 'Rezzonico).

Centered at the back, the Balbi Palace, recognizable by its two obelisks on the roof, and on both sides, on the left, the bell tower of the Basilica of Santa Maria Gloriosa dei Frari, on the right the bell tower of the Church of San Tomà. The sky is particularly neat with its shooting clouds.

Sources
Joconde Portail des collections des musées de France.Ministry of Culture.

Paintings by Bernardo Bellotto
Paintings in the collection of the Museum of Fine Arts of Lyon
1730s paintings
Ships in art
Cityscape paintings of Venice